Jorge Luiz Barbosa Teixeira (born 21 June 1999), commonly known as Jorge Luiz, is a Brazilian footballer who plays as a forward for Portuguese club Feirense.

Career statistics

Club

References

1999 births
Living people
Brazilian footballers
Brazilian expatriate footballers
Association football forwards
Liga Portugal 2 players
Grêmio Foot-Ball Porto Alegrense players
U.D. Oliveirense players
C.D. Feirense players
Brazilian expatriate sportspeople in Portugal
Expatriate footballers in Portugal